Drahomira is an extinct genus of paleozoic monoplacophorans in the family Tryblidiidae.

Distribution 
Czech Republic.

Genera 
Species in the genus Drahomira include:
 Drahomira barrandei
 Drahomira glaseri
 Drahomira kriziana
 Drahomira rugata

References

Prehistoric monoplacophorans
Prehistoric mollusc genera